Aziza Sleyum Ally is a Member of Parliament in the National Assembly of Tanzania.

References

Living people
Year of birth missing (living people)
Members of the National Assembly (Tanzania)